Gootchie is a locality in the Fraser Coast Region, Queensland, Australia.

History 
The locality name comes from a grazing property and the railway station name formerly spelt Gutchy. It is reportedly an Aboriginal word from the Kabi language, Badjala dialect, meaning sand goanna.

Education 
There are no schools in Gootchie. The nearest primary school is in neighbouring Gundiah and Glenwood. The nearest secondary school are either the Maryborough State High School or the James Nash State High School in Gympie.

References 

Fraser Coast Region
Localities in Queensland